The 1895 Syracuse Orangemen football team represented Syracuse University during the 1895 college football season. The head coach was George O. Redington, coaching his first season with the Orangemen.

The Orange had a their first real home field in the Oval, as it was known then. The field, located behind the Hall of Languages, was available for students since the 1880s, but most team sports were played in the Star Park. With deliberate effort to make the Oval the center of SU athletics, the University formally opened the Oval as the new athletic field on June 8, 1895.

This was the first year when the Orange recorded a victory against rival Colgate, winning by the score of 4-0.

Schedule

Source:

References

Syracuse
Syracuse Orange football seasons
Syracuse Orangemen football